Jaya Simhavarman IV, Mahendravarman, or Chế Chí (制至), son of Chế Mân and first queen Princess Bhaskaradevi, was born in 1284 as Prince Harijitatmaja. He reigned as the king of Champa from 1307 - 1312.

Because Chế Chí's Vietnamese mother refused to die with her husband and Chế Chí's father, Chế Mân, Chế Chí set out to recapture two districts ceded by Champa to Annam in their time of peace brought on by the wedding of his father and mother. He was defeated, however, and died a prisoner in Annam. After his capture, his brother, Che Da A Ba, or Che Nang, was assigned to govern Champa by the Dai Viet.

References 

Kings of Champa
Hindu monarchs
14th-century Vietnamese monarchs
Vietnamese monarchs